Hermann Weinbuch (born 22 March 1960 in Bischofswiesen, Bavaria, West Germany) is a former West German nordic combined skier who won four medals at the FIS Nordic World Ski Championships during the 1980s. In 1985, he won the 15 km individual and 3 x 10 km team gold medals, then followed it up two years later with two more medals (gold: 3 x 10 km, bronze: 15 km individual).

Weinbuch also competed at the 1984 Winter Olympics in Sarajevo in the Nordic combined event, finishing 8th.

He also competed at the Holmenkollen ski festival, winning the Nordic combined event twice (1985, 1987). Weinbuch was awarded the Holmenkollen medal in 1987 (Shared with Matti Nykänen.).

At the 2006 Winter Olympics in Turin, he was a trainer on the German national Nordic combined team that would win a complete of medals (Georg Hettich - individual gold, sprint bronze; team silver).

References

External links

Holmenkollen medalists - click Holmenkollmedaljen for downloadable pdf file 
Holmenkollen winners since 1892 - click Vinnere for downloadable pdf file 
Weinbuch information 

1960 births
Nordic combined skiers at the 1980 Winter Olympics
Nordic combined skiers at the 1984 Winter Olympics
Nordic combined skiers at the 1988 Winter Olympics
German male Nordic combined skiers
German male ski jumpers
Holmenkollen medalists
Holmenkollen Ski Festival winners
Living people
Olympic Nordic combined skiers of West Germany
FIS Nordic Combined World Cup winners
FIS Nordic World Ski Championships medalists in Nordic combined
People from Berchtesgadener Land
Sportspeople from Upper Bavaria
Ski jumpers at the 1980 Winter Olympics
Olympic ski jumpers of West Germany